Leucosia anatum, also known as the pebble crab,  is a species of crab in the family  Leucosiidae.

Description
This species has a strongly convex, elongate carapace. Its outline is somewhat rhomboidal. The front edge of the carapace is slender and obtusely triangular, with a pointed postorbital that points upward at an oblique angle. It has stout ambulatory legs, with each section being cylindrical and fairly smooth.

Distribution
This species is known to occur in the following locations:
 Madagascar
 Mauritius
 Persian Gulf
 Pakistan
 Sri Lanka
 Andaman Islands
 Mergui Archipelago
 Japan: multiple locations
 Korea
 Taiwan
 China in the sea around Guangdong
 Gulf of Tonkin
 Philippines: south of Manila Bay
 Indonesia: Ambon (type locality)
 Australia: multiple location
 New Caledonia: Ilot Maitre
 Fiji

References

Crabs
Crustaceans described in 1783